Detective is a 1958 Bollywood film starring Pradeep Kumar and Mala Sinha. It is one of the first films directed by Shakti Samanta which failed to become a success. Production and music were by Mukul Roy.

Cast
Pradeep Kumar as Raja Ghosh
Mala Sinha as Mashin Loonpe
Johnny Walker as John Butler
Daisy Irani as Master
K.N. Singh as Gonsalves
Krishnakant as Sukhdev
Moni Chatterjee as Loonpe
Dhumal as Chaudhary
Gautam Mukherjee as Police Commissioner 
Bhagwan Sinha
Ratan Gaurang
Bhattacharya
Bimla Kumari

Music

References

External links
 

1958 films
1950s Hindi-language films
Films directed by Shakti Samanta
Films scored by Mukul Roy